Hugh Sew Hoy  (26 November 1901 – 5 November 1996) was a New Zealand businessman and community leader. He was born in Guangdong Province, China, in 1901.

In the 1981 Queen's Birthday Honours, Sew Hoy was appointed an Officer of the Order of the British Empire, for services to export and the community.

References

1901 births
1996 deaths
Businesspeople from Guangdong
Chinese emigrants to New Zealand
20th-century New Zealand businesspeople
New Zealand Officers of the Order of the British Empire